The Smell of Rain is an album released by solo artist Mortiis in 2001. Released in 2001 under the Earache label. This was the first album where Mortiis took the role as lead vocalist, which had previously been filled by Sarah Jezebel Deva. Mortiis looks back on this album, and is amazed at how 'gothic' it sounds - even though it wasn't intended.

Release and background 
The initial CD press run for Germany contained a bonus DVD including the 'Parasite God' video. The LP was a double gatefold with a 12" lyric insert. A remastered version was released later, as Mortiis requested. It contained four remixed songs. Initial attempts at getting the CD booklet printed as transparent layers of art and text was turned down by the label, several times. Though this was done for the next album (The Grudge) as a "Strictly Ltd Edition 'Decadent' PVC Sleeve". 

The artwork was produced by Johan Hammarman. On the back of the album, there is a circle with symbols inside. This is a form of the 'Secret Seal of Solomon'. In the booklet, Mortiis is seen unmasked under the pseudonym of 'John Prozac'.

Track listing
All Songs Written By Mortiis.
"Scar Trek / Parasite God"  – 6:02
"Flux / Mental Maelstrom"  – 6:46
"Spirit in a Vacuum"  – 4:53
"Monolith"  – 3:59
"You Put a Hex on Me"  – 5:45
"Everyone Leaves"  – 6:41
"Marshland"  – 4:43
"Antimental"  – 6:17
"Smell the Witch"  – 5:43

The following tracks were remixes available on a special remastered edition released in 2002:

"Paranoid God Pt.1 (the iconoclast mix)"  – 7:00 - Brian Lustmord
"Marshland (the excursion mix)"  – 4:40 - Raven Fox
"Monolithic dub"  – 7:44 - Brian Lustmord
"You Put a Hex on Me"  – 3:51 - Tarmvred

Personnel
Mortiis: Lead Vocal, Keyboards, Synthesizers, Synth Programming, Drum Programming
Martina Binder: Additional Lead Vocal
Sarah Jezebel Deva: Vocal Harmonies, Soprano Vocal
Mika Lindberg, "Raptor", Suvi-Tuulia Virtanen: Alto Vocals
Chris A.: Guitars
Alzahr: Bass
Staffan Wieslander, Åsa Anveden: Cello
Cecilia Lindgren, Johanna Wetter: Violin
Frederik Bergstrom: Tympani, Percussion

Production
Arranged, Produced, Recorded & Engineered By Mortiis
Percussion Recorded & Engineered By Erik Lundberg
Mixed By Rickard Bengtsson & Mortiis
Mastered By Rickard Bengtsson

References

External links
"The Smell Of Rain" at discogs

Mortiis albums
2001 albums
Earache Records albums